Devon Motorworks was an American car brand based in Los Angeles, California that specialized in the development of premium lifestyle products. The company was notable for being the sole bidder for the Dodge Viper.

Company 

Founded in 2008 by entrepreneur Scott Devon, Devon Motorworks' stated focus is to undertake "multiple design projects that have a common purpose of providing sculptural power with recognizable beauty."  Devon's initial production vehicle, the Devon GTX super car, was scheduled to begin production in early 2010, however, economic downturn shelved production.

Devon Motorworks made news for being the single bidder for Chrysler's Dodge Viper platform, originally intended to provide the basis for the Devon GTX. The bid was, however, rejected by Chrysler for being below the US$10.0 million reserve and with the fourth-generation Viper upon which the GTX was derived being discontinued, Devon Motorworks was closed.

Products 
The initial product, Devon GTX, was unveiled in 2009 Pebble Beach Concours d’Elegance. The vehicle was conceived by Swedish designer Daniel Paulin  and Devon Motor Works Founder Scott Devon, who shared a vision for an American supercar that combined classic and contemporary design cues.

The distinguishing features of the Devon GTX included an aircraft-quality carbon fiber body, “up and forward” articulating doors, two-tone wheel surrounds, minimal front/rear overhangs, dual center exhaust ports and carbon fiber racing seats.

In validation testing, the vehicle set an unofficial lap record at California’s Willow Springs Raceway. Following subsequent testing, spy photos of the prototype appeared online.

Product development for the Devon GTX was led by former Ford executive engineer Andy Benedict, while assembly and manufacturing was headed by Clive Hawkins, founder of the Aria Group. Aerodynamic testing was supervised by Dr. Joseph Katz, Chairman of the Department of Aerospace Engineering and Engineering Mechanics at San Diego State University.   Vehicle validation and testing was handled by former 24 Hours of Le Mans champion Justin Bell.

Two GTX cars were completed before production ceased, with one selling for $220,000 at a Barrett-Jackson auction in 2012.

References 

Defunct motor vehicle manufacturers of the United States
Sports car manufacturers
Motor vehicle manufacturers based in California